2-Methylfuran, also known with the older name of sylvane, is a flammable, water-insoluble liquid with a chocolate odor, found naturally in Myrtle and Dutch Lavender
used as a FEMA GRAS flavoring substance, with the potential for use in alternative fuels.

Manufacture
2-Methylfuran is an article of commerce (chemical intermediate) and is normally manufactured by catalytic hydrogenolysis of furfural alcohol or via a hydrogenation-hydrogenolysis sequence from furfural in the vapor phase.

See also
Swiftfuel

References

External links
  NCBI PubChem database: Methylfuran

Biofuels
Food additives
2-Furyl compounds